Michel "Mike" Lajoie is an American politician from Lewiston, Maine. A former member of the Maine House of Representatives, Lajoie currently serves on the Lewiston City Council.

References

External links
Representative Michel Lajoie

Year of birth missing (living people)
Living people
Lewiston, Maine City Council members
Democratic Party members of the Maine House of Representatives